The Florida State University College of Education is one of sixteen colleges comprising the Florida State University (FSU). The College has roots that reach back to the West Florida Seminary and the State Normal College for Teachers. The College has a number of nationally ranked programs and is in the Top 20 nationally in terms of doctoral degrees awarded.

The College of Education has four academic departments which offer undergraduate and graduate degree programs in 27 fields of study. The academic programs prepare students for positions as leaders in the classroom and school system environment, as well as those who conduct research to improve education, instruction and policy.  Five online graduate degree program areas are available through the Distance Learning Program. The College operates the Florida State University School, a charter school in southeast Tallahassee.

National rankings
U.S. News & World Report (2023 Edition)
 Overall College of Education - 26th overall
 Curriculum and Instruction - 23rd overall
 Education Administration and Supervision - 18th overall
 Higher Education Administration - 13th overall
 Special Education - 16th overall

In 2015, online graduate programs were ranked 2nd in the nation among both public and private universities by U.S. News & World Report.

References

External links

 
Educational institutions established in 1905
Schools of education in Florida
1905 establishments in Florida